Provincial Actors is a 1979 Polish drama film directed by Agnieszka Holland. It is her feature-length directorial debut.

Plot
The film depicts Slawomir Szczepan (played by Tomasz Zygadlo), a young theater director from Warsaw, arriving in the provinces to put on the play Liberation by Stanisław Wyspiański. There he clashes with the aging lead actor Krzysztof (Tadeusz Huk), who sees it as a chance to make a once-in-a-lifetime performance.

References

External links

1979 directorial debut films
1979 films
Films about actors
Films directed by Agnieszka Holland
Polish drama films
1970s Polish-language films
1979 drama films